The 2010–11 season was the 99th season in RNK Split's history, their first in the Prva HNL and 20th in the league system of Croatian football. Their 1st-place finish in the 2009–10 season marked their return to top flight after 49 years, having been relegated from the 1960–61 Yugoslav First League. It was also Ivan Katalinić's first season as manager of RNK Split, after he was appointed following the removal of Tonči Bašić in June 2010.

Bašić made the most of his new signings following the end of the previous season, including Romano Obilinović, Igor Budiša and Velimir Vidić. The season started with an away defeat to Rijeka, which was followed by their first win in Prva HNL, a 4–0 victory over Varaždin at Park mladeži. After a seven-match unbeaten run propelled RNK Split to the third place, they suffered a decline in form and recorded only one win in eight matches. During the mid-season club signed Filip Marčić and Ivica Križanac on a free transfer. After the winter break, they lost only twice in the remaining 12 matches, against Hajduk Split and Osijek. RNK Split finished the season in 3rd place and qualified for the 2011–12 UEFA Europa League.

The club reached the final of the Split-Dalmatia County Cup, where the team defeated Dugopolje 5–4 in the penalty shootout after the match ended 1–1. This feat ensured them a place in the preliminary round of the Croatian Cup in the next season. Bojan Golubović was the club's top goalscorer after scoring 6 goals.

First-team squad

Competitions

Overall

Prva HNL

Classification

Results summary

Results by round

Results by opponent

Source: 2010–11 Prva HNL article

Matches

Pre-season

Prva HNL

Split-Dalmatia County Cup

Last updated 24 May 2011Sources: Prva-HNL.hr, Sportnet.hr

Player seasonal records
Competitive matches only. Updated to games played 21 May 2011.

Goalscorers

Source: Competitive matches

Squad statistics

Sources: Prva-HNL.hr, rnksplit.hr

Transfers

In

Out

Loans out

Sources: nogometni-magazin.com

References

External links
 Official website 

Croatian football clubs 2010–11 season
2010-11